Alshamary or Alshammari or Al-Shammari (in Arabic الشمري) is an Arabic surname. Notable people with the surname include:

Persons 

 Nohair Al-Shammari
 Mikhlif Alshammari
 Saad Al-Shammari
 Suad Al-Shammari
 Mohanad Ali Kadhim Al-Shammari

Tribe 
Shammar

There are over 12 million members in the world; 6.5 million in Saudi Arabia, 3 million in Iraq, 0.5 million in Syrian, along with an unconfirmed number in Jordan, Kuwait, and Qatar.

Variant Spellings 
Although only one form of spelling in the Arabic language (الشمري), the spelling of this surname tends to differ upon romanisation, this is just how the English language works and there is no standard spelling for most surnames, if not all. English professors, teachers, authors, writers and any figure specialising in the English language are all trying their best to standardise English and keep it following one rule and one form.

Frequent methods of spelling (الشمري) includes:

Alshamary, Alshammari, Alshamery, Alshamari, Al-Shammari and many other variants. Names can be romanised and spelled how ever liked. A small percentage also spells this surname as Shamary/Shamari or Shammary/Shammari.

Sweden 
The family name of Swedish swimmer Therese Alshammar has a different origin than Al(-)shamary (or any other variant spellings) because it is derived from "Hammar", which is a common Swedish name for people  as well as for places. However her name seemed to have been mistaken for having a connection to the Middle East.

References